Dendrochernes is a genus of arachnids belonging to the family Chernetidae.

The species of this genus are found in Europe and Northern America.

Species:
 Dendrochernes crassus Hoff, 1956

References

Chernetidae
Pseudoscorpion genera